Israel George Lash (August 18, 1810 – April 1, 1878) was a Congressional Representative from North Carolina; born in Bethania, North Carolina, August 18, 1810.  He attended the common schools and the local academy in his native city; engaged in mercantile pursuits and subsequently became a cigar manufacturer; also engaged in banking in Salem, North Carolina; delegate to the State constitutional convention in 1868; upon the readmission of the State of North Carolina to representation was elected as a Republican to the Fortieth Congress; reelected to the Forty-first Congress and served from July 20, 1868, to March 3, 1871; was not a candidate for renomination in 1870; again engaged in banking in Salem (now Winston-Salem) N.C., until his death there on April 1, 1878; interment in the Moravian Cemetery, Bethania, N.C.

Lash owned at least thirty enslaved people in Forsyth County, North Carolina.

See also
 40th United States Congress
 41st United States Congress

References

External links 
 U.S. Congressional Biographical Directory entry

1810 births
1878 deaths
People from Forsyth County, North Carolina
Republican Party members of the United States House of Representatives from North Carolina
19th-century American politicians